Cochrane is a town in the Calgary Metropolitan Region of Alberta, Canada. Cochrane is one of the fastest-growing communities in Canada, and with a population of 32,199 in 2021, it is one of the largest towns in Alberta. It is part of Calgary's census metropolitan area and a member community of the Calgary Metropolitan Region Board (CMRB). The town is surrounded by Rocky View County.

History 
Cochrane was established in 1881 as the Cochrane Ranche, after Matthew Henry Cochrane, a local rancher. It became a village in 1903 and it had a newspaper and volunteer fire department by 1909. Cochrane incorporated as a town in 1971.

Geography 
Cochrane is situated at the base of Big Hill in the Bow River Valley. The town is intersected by Highway 1A and Highway 22. Cochrane has a reputation for its western  culture, which can easily be felt when one wanders the streets (particularly Main Street). The town is a popular destination for ice cream and coffee in its quaint western-oriented stores as well as for windsports, golfing, hiking and other adventure activities.

Cochrane is also a small industrial centre. Major industries include lumber, construction, retail, and agriculture (ranching). It is notable as being one of very few communities in Canada with no business tax.

The hill is also a popular training ground for cyclists from the area, who take advantage of its 7% grade and  distance.

Neighbourhoods 
The following neighbourhoods are located within Cochrane.

 Bow Meadows
 Bow Ridge
 Cochrane Heights
 Downtown
 East End
 Fireside 
 Glenbow
 GlenEagles
 Greystone
 Heartland
 Heritage Hills
 Jumping Pound Ridge
 Precedence
 Rivercrest
 Riversong
 Riviera
 Riverview
 Rolling Range Estates
 Rolling Trails
 Southbow Landing
 South Ridge
 Sunset Ridge
 The Willows
 West Pointe
 West Terrace
 West Valley

Sports 
The Cochrane Generals are a Junior B Hockey Club based out of Cochrane Alberta Canada. They are members of the South Division In the Heritage Junior Hockey League. They have been playing out of the Original Cochrane Arena from (1984-2001) - (2018-Present)

Demographics 

At its current population, Cochrane is one of the largest towns in the province and is eligible for city status. According to Alberta's Municipal Government Act, a town is eligible for city status when it reaches 10,000 residents.

In the 2016 Census of Population conducted by Statistics Canada, the Town of Cochrane recorded a population of 25,853 living in 9,757 of its 10,225 total private dwellings, a  change from its 2011 population of 17,580.

Arts and culture 
Cochrane Ranche provided the corral setting for the 1954 National Film Board of Canada documentary Corral, by Colin Low, whose father had worked as a foreman at the ranch. This film played theatrically across Canada and was named Best Documentary at the Venice Film Festival.

Cochrane houses attractions such as Cochrane Ranche Historic Site and Bert Sheppard Stockmen's Foundation Library And Archives, located in the Cochrane Ranchehouse.

Cochrane is home to many annual events each year:
 Pumpkin lantern festival: October 
 Chamber of Commerce Trade Fair: Early May
  Canada Day (July 1)
 Cochrane and Area Events Society, with support from the Town of Cochrane presents the Canada Day Community Celebration: Canada Day (July 1)
 Labour Day Rodeo & Parade: Labour Day weekend. In 2019 the parade had over 80 floats participate.
 Terry Fox Run: September
 Christmas Light-up: Late November

Government 
Municipal politics
Cochrane has a town council consisting of an elected mayor and six councillors elected at-large. Councillors are elected by the eligible electors by voting for up to six candidates and the six receiving the largest number of votes being elected. The position of deputy mayor is rotated through the councillors over their term. Elections are held on the third Monday in October every fourth year.

As of October 19, 2021, the town council consists of mayor Jeff Genung and Councillors Susan Flowers, Patrick Wilson, Morgan Nagel, Marni Fedeyko, Tara McFadden, Alex Reed.

Provincial politics
Cochrane is located within the provincial electoral division of Airdrie-Cochrane. It has been represented in the Alberta Legislature by UCP MLA Peter Guthrie since the 2019 provincial election.

Federal politics
Cochrane is located in the federal electoral district of Banff-Airdrie and is represented by Blake Richards in the House of Commons. He also represented Cochrane from 2008-2015 as the MP for the federal electoral district of Wild Rose. He replaced long standing MP Myron Thompson, who was originally elected as a member of the Reform Party in 1993.

Education 

Cochrane is home to schools from the public Rocky View School Division No. 41, the separate Calgary Catholic School District, and the Greater Southern Alberta Catholic Francophone Region #4 (CSCFSA).

As of 2022, there were twelve public and separate schools in operation within the town boundaries.
Rocky View School Division No. 41
Cochrane High School: Grades 9–12
Bow Valley High School: Grades 9–12
Rancheview School: Kindergarten, Grades 1-8
Elizabeth Barret Elementary School: Kindergarten, Grades 1–4
Glenbow Elementary School: Kindergarten, Grades 1–4
Mitford School: Grades 5-8
Manachaban Middle School|Manachaban Middle School Grades 5-8
Cochrane Christian Academy: Kindergarten, Grades 1-8
Fireside School: Kindergarten, Grades 1-7
Calgary Catholic School District         
Holy Spirit: Kindergarten, Grades 1–6
St. Timothy: Grades 7–12
Nôtre Dame Des Vallées: Kindergarten, Grades 1–8 (French-Catholic school GSACFR#4 or CSCFSA)

In November 2006 the Rocky View School Division accepted a proposal by the Cochrane Christ-Centred Education Society to set up a Protestant Christian education program in Cochrane. The Cochrane Christian Academy opened its doors at Mitford Middle School in September 2007, offering kindergarten to grade 4. Approval for expansion to include grade 5 for the 2008–09 school year was given by the board of trustees in April 2008.

There are two trustees (one from each board) elected to represent Cochrane Schools at their respective boards.

The Greater Southern Alberta Catholic Francophone Region #4 has one trustee for the Region from Cochrane.

Cochrane is also home to the Canadian Southern Baptist Seminary, the flagship seminary of the Canadian National Baptist Convention, the Canadian branch of the largest US Protestant denomination.

Notable people 
Rob Cote, professional football player
Justin Dowling, professional ice hockey player
George Fox, musician
Ethan Gage, professional soccer player
Mason Raymond, professional ice hockey player
Dillon Dubé, professional ice hockey player
Paul Brandt, musician
John Hufnagel President And GM of Calgary Stampeders

Transit 
On October 7, 2019 the town launched COLT (Cochrane On-Demand Local Transit). An app based local transportation service by bus to convey commuters throughout the community. After many years of debate of having a transit service that best suits the town, COLT was born out of the need for transit and the financial responsibility of app based service. The service currently runs 6 a.m.-8 p.m. on weekdays, 9 a.m.-3 p.m. on Saturdays. The town plans to adjust the schedule only as needed. Currently there are over 100 stops located across Cochrane.

See also 
List of communities in Alberta

References

External links 

1903 establishments in the Northwest Territories
Populated places established in 1903
Calgary Region
Rocky View County
Towns in Alberta